The adrenal arteries are arteries in the human abdomen that supply blood to the adrenal glands.

The adrenal glands receive input from three different arteries on both the left and right sides of the body:
 superior suprarenal artery branching from the inferior phrenic artery
 middle suprarenal artery branching from the abdominal aorta
 inferior suprarenal artery branching from the renal artery

References 

Arteries of the abdomen